Robert Scott Bradshaw Burkitt was Archdeacon of Lismore from 1912 until his death in 1940.

Burkitt was educated at Trinity College, Dublin. After a curacy in Killinane he was the  incumbent at Cappoquin  from 1898 until his death.

Notes

Alumni of Trinity College Dublin
Archdeacons of Lismore
19th-century Irish Anglican priests
20th-century Irish Anglican priests